Corema is a genus of two species of flowering plants in the family Ericaceae. They are dioecious small shrubs.

Species
 Corema album (L.) D. Don ex Steud. Corema album is also known for it common name Camarinha or Portuguese crowberry. The drupe of this subspecies is white when ripe, and it is edible. The shrub grows to 1 meter, on average, and its branches have a honey-like aroma.
 Corema conradii (Torr.) Torr. ex Loudon

References

 

Ericaceae genera
Ericoideae
Dioecious plants